Nero Linux is a port of Nero Burning ROM developed for various Linux distributions.

In March 2005, software publisher Nero AG offered free licenses for Nero Linux to users of the Microsoft Windows version. Applying the GTK+ widget toolkit, Glibc, and libstdc++, Nero Linux reproduced most of the features of Nero Burning ROM. Nero AG published the final update to Nero Linux in December 2010.

Supported distributions
The list of supported distributions: 

Debian GNU/Linux 4.0 (or higher)
Fedora 7.0 (or higher)
Red Hat Enterprise Linux 5.0 (or higher)
SUSE Linux 10.3 (or higher)
Ubuntu 7.04 (or higher)

Version history

See also
Nero (software suite)
Nero Digital
Nero AAC Codec
List of optical disc authoring software

References

2005 software
Linux CD/DVD writing software
Software that uses GTK